Volumetric efficiency (VE) in internal combustion engine engineering is defined as the ratio of the mass density of the air-fuel mixture drawn into the cylinder at atmospheric pressure (during the intake stroke) to the mass density of the same volume of air in the intake manifold. The term is also used in other engineering contexts, such as hydraulic pumps and electronic components.

Internal combustion engines
Volumetric efficiency in an internal combustion engine design refers to the efficiency with which the engine can move the charge of fuel and air into and out of the cylinders. It also denotes the ratio of air volume drawn into the cylinder to the cylinder's swept volume. More specifically, volumetric efficiency is a ratio (or percentage) of the mass of air and fuel that is trapped by the cylinder during induction divided by the mass that would occupy the displaced volume if the air density in the cylinder were equal to the ambient air density. The flow restrictions in the intake system create a pressure drop in the inlet flow which reduces the density (unless boosts like turbos or superchargers or cam tuning techniques are used). Volumetric efficiency can be improved in a number of ways, most effectively this can be achieved by compressing the induction charge (forced induction) or by aggressive cam phasing in naturally aspirated engines as seen in racing applications. In the case of forced induction volumetric efficiency can exceed 100%.

There are several ways to improve volumetric efficiency, but system-wide approaches are used to realize its full potential.

Many high performance cars use carefully arranged air intakes and tuned exhaust systems that use pressure waves to push air into and out of the cylinders, making use of the resonance of the system. Two-stroke engines are very sensitive to this concept and can use expansion chambers that return the escaping air-fuel mixture back to the cylinder. A more modern technique for four-stroke engines, variable valve timing, attempts to address changes in volumetric efficiency with changes in speed of the engine: at higher speeds the engine needs the valves open for a greater percentage of the cycle time to move the charge in and out of the engine.

Volumetric efficiencies above 100% can be reached by using forced induction such as supercharging or turbocharging. With proper tuning, volumetric efficiencies above 100% can also be reached by naturally aspirated engines. The limit for naturally aspirated engines is about 130%; these engines are typically of a DOHC layout with four valves per cylinder.  This process is called inertial supercharging and uses the resonance of the intake manifold and the mass of the air to achieve pressures greater than atmospheric at the intake valve. With proper tuning (and dependent on the need for sound level control), VE's of up to 130% have been reported in various experimental studies.

More "radical" solutions include the sleeve valve design, in which the valves are replaced outright with a rotating sleeve around the piston, or alternately a rotating sleeve under the cylinder head. In this system the ports can be as large as necessary, up to that of the entire cylinder wall. However, there is a practical upper limit due to the strength of the sleeve, at larger sizes the pressure inside the cylinder can "pop" the sleeve if the port is too large.

Hydraulic pumps
Volumetric efficiency in a hydraulic pump refers to the percentage of actual fluid flow out of the pump compared to the flow out of the pump without leakage. In other words, if the flow out of a 100cc pump is 92cc (per revolution), then the volumetric efficiency is 92%. The volumetric efficiency will change with the pressure and speed a pump is operated at, therefore when comparing volumetric efficiencies, the pressure and speed information must be available. When a single number is given for volumetric efficiency, it will typically be at the rated pressure and speed.

Electronics

In electronics, volumetric efficiency quantifies the performance of some electronic function per unit volume, usually in as small a space as possible.  This is desirable since advanced designs need to cram increasing functionality into smaller packages, for example, maximizing the energy stored in a battery powering a cellphone.  Besides energy storage in batteries, the concept of volumetric efficiency appears in design and application of capacitors, where the "CV product" is a figure of merit calculated by multiplying the capacitance (C) by the maximum voltage rating (V), divided by the volume. The concept of volumetric efficiency can be applied to any measurable electronic characteristic, including resistance, capacitance, inductance, voltage, current, energy storage, etc.

See also
Two-stroke power valve system
Variable compression ratio

Notes

External links
 2 Stroke Tuned Pipe (Expansion Chamber) Design Software

Engine technology
Two-stroke engine technology
Engineering ratios